Drawing Hands is a lithograph by the  Dutch  artist M. C. Escher first printed in January 1948. It depicts a sheet of paper, out of which two hands rise, in the  paradoxical act of drawing one another into existence. This is one of the most obvious examples of Escher's common use of paradox.

It is referenced in the book Gödel, Escher, Bach, by Douglas Hofstadter, who calls it an example of a strange loop. It is used in Structure and Interpretation of Computer Programs by Harold Abelson and Gerald Jay Sussman as an allegory for the eval and apply functions of programming language interpreters in computer science, which feed each other.

Drawing Hands has been referenced and copied many times by artists in different ways. In tech culture, robot hands draw or build each other, or a human hand and robot hand draw each other.

References

Bibliography
 

1948 paintings
Works by M. C. Escher